East Hills, an electoral district of the Legislative Assembly in the Australian state of New South Wales, has existed from 1953 to the present.


Members for East Hills

Election results

Elections in the 2010s

2019

2015

2011

Elections in the 2000s

2007

2003

Elections in the 1990s

1999

1995

1991

Elections in the 1980s

1988

1984

1981

Elections in the 1970s

1978

1976

1973

1971

Elections in the 1960s

1968

1965

1962

Elections in the 1950s

1959

1956

1953

References

New South Wales state electoral results by district